WBLJ-FM (95.3 MHz) is a radio station broadcasting a country music format. The station is licensed to Shamokin, Pennsylvania, United States. The station is owned by iHeartMedia. It is simulcast on WBYL in Salladasburg.

History
The station went on the air as WISL-FM on February 25, 1980 as a sister station to WISL (1480 AM).  On January 27, 1982, the station changed its call sign to WSPI, then back to WISL-FM on October 26, 1992, and finally on December 26, 2001 to the current WBLJ.

References

External links

BLJ-FM
Radio stations established in 1980
IHeartMedia radio stations